Param may refer to:

PARAM, a series of Indian supercomputers
Param (company), a video game developer
Param, Iran, a village in East Azerbaijan Province, Iran
Param, Mazandaran, a village in Mazandaran Province, Iran
Param, Chuuk, Micronesia, a municipality
Param, Rampur, India, a village
an abbreviation for parameter

See also
Para (disambiguation)